Archie is an upcoming television drama series about the life of Cary Grant starring Jason Isaacs in the lead role with Kara Tointon, Harriet Walter, Jason Watkins, Calam Lynch, and Laura Aikman.

Synopsis
The series is set to explore the man born Archibald Leach, born into poverty in Bristol in 1904, long before he became Hollywood’s Cary Grant. Additionally, scenes set later will feature, where Grant in Los Angeles in the 1960s, with personal issues affecting his happiness despite international stardom and many box office hit movies.

Cast
 Jason Isaacs as Cary Grant
Dainton Anderson as young Archie
Oaklee Pendergast
Calam Lynch as Archie
Harriet Walter as Elsie Leach
Kara Tointon as Young Elsie
Henry Lloyd-Hughes
Ian Puleston-Davies
Ian McNeice
Jason Watkins
Lisa Faulkner
Niamh Cusack

Production
Despite Grant’s Bristol upbringing, and the city of Bristol being the setting for large parts of the series, filming is actually scheduled to take place in the city of Liverpool in the summer of 2022. The 4 part series is written by Jeff Pope. Filming also took place in Manchester and Cheshire in September 2022. Pope interviewed Grant’s daughter Jennifer Grant and Grant’s ex-wife Dyan Cannon for the production and both act as Executive Producers. ITV Studios produce with BritBox International as co-producers and Paul Andrew Williams as director. In September 2022, Harriet Walter was added to the cast as Grant’s mother Elsie Leach, and Calam Lynch, Dainton Anderson and Oaklee Pendergast were added as younger versions of Archie. Additional cast members added included Jason Watkins, Lisa Faulkner, Niamh Cusack, Kara Tointon, Laura Aikman, Henry Lloyd-Hughes, Ian Puleston-Davies and Ian McNeice.

Broadcast
The series will be available in the UK on the streaming service ITVX before it is broadcast on ITV in the UK. International broadcast is not yet announced.

Reception
News of the production was reported by The Independent as having a positive response by fans.

References

2020s British drama television series
2023 British television series debuts
English-language television shows
Television shows set in Bristol
Television series by ITV Studios
ITV television dramas
Upcoming drama television series
Television shows shot in Liverpool